Kinchafoonee Creek is a creek in southwest Georgia.

Its name comes from the Creek word for "mortar nutshells", which refers to a type of nutcracker.

The creek flows through Chattahoochee, Marion, Dougherty, Lee, Terrell, and Webster (formerly Kinchafoonee) counties.

References

2Kinchafoonee
Rivers of Chattahoochee County, Georgia
Rivers of Dougherty County, Georgia
Rivers of Marion County, Georgia
Rivers of Lee County, Georgia
Rivers of Georgia (U.S. state)
Rivers of Webster County, Georgia